North Carolina Highway 212 (NC 212) is a primary state highway in the U.S. state of North Carolina.  The highway connects the White Rock community, through the Bald Mountains, in Madison County.

Route description
NC 212 is a  two-lane mountain highway that begins in the community of Belva at NC 208.  Traveling in a northeasterly direction, it hugs along the banks of the Shelton Laurel Creek, arriving in the community of White Rock  into the trip. Continuing on, it travels through the heart of the Pisgah National Forest, going between Limestone and Sugarloaf Mountains.  At Devil Fork Gap (highest point on route), it crosses both the Appalachian Trail and the Tennessee state line, continuing on as SR 352 towards Johnson City.

History
NC 212 was established in 1926 as a new primary routing between NC 208 in Belva and Devil Fork Gap at the Tennessee state line. In 1984, NCDOT reversed their decision and reinstated NC 212 to the Tennessee state line.

Junction list

References

External links

 
 NCRoads.com: N.C. 212

212
Transportation in Madison County, North Carolina